Heinz Robert Mörschel (born 24 August 1997) is a Dominican-born German professional footballer who plays as a midfielder for Hungarian club Újpest.

Club career
Mörschel is a youth exponent from 1. FSV Mainz 05. He made his 3. Liga debut with Mainz 05 II on 10 August 2016 against VfL Osnabrück.

In June 2018, Mörschel joined 2. Bundesliga side Holstein Kiel on a two-year contract. He then joined SC Preußen Münster on 1 July 2019.

In August 2020, he joined KFC Uerdingen 05 on a contract until June 2022. However, he left Uerdingen prematurely and joined Dynamo Dresden in January 2021.

References

1997 births
Sportspeople from Santo Domingo
German people of Dominican Republic descent
Sportspeople of Dominican Republic descent
Living people
German footballers
Germany youth international footballers
Dominican Republic footballers
Association football midfielders
1. FSV Mainz 05 II players
Holstein Kiel players
SC Preußen Münster players
KFC Uerdingen 05 players
Dynamo Dresden players
Újpest FC players
2. Bundesliga players
3. Liga players
Regionalliga players
Nemzeti Bajnokság I players
German expatriate footballers
Expatriate footballers in Hungary
German expatriate sportspeople in Hungary